Ringo 2012 is the 17th studio album by Ringo Starr, released on 30 January 2012 in the United Kingdom and 31 January 2012 in the United States. It was released on CD, LP and digitally by Hip-O Records and UMe.

History
Starr had considered calling the album Motel California, then Another #9, and finally Wings, before settling on Ringo 2012. The album was recorded in Los Angeles, and mixed in England, produced by Starr and Bruce Sugar. The title is a reference to Starr's most successful solo album, Ringo, which was released in 1973. At less than 29 minutes in length, it was his shortest album to date.

Ringo 2012 includes new recordings of two songs that Starr had issued on previous albums: "Step Lightly", from Ringo, and "Wings", from 1977's Ringo the 4th. His cover of Buddy Holly's "Think It Over" was released on the Listen to Me: Buddy Holly tribute album before its appearance on Ringo 2012. The new version of "Wings" was released as a single a few weeks in advance of the album.

The inclusion of the track "In Liverpool" meant that Ringo 2012 was Starr's third consecutive album to include a song about Liverpool, his hometown. Asked why this was, he told Alan Light of Newsweek: "I came to the conclusion a while ago that I do not want to write an autobiography, because all anybody wants is those eight years from 1962 to 1970, and I would have ten volumes before we got there. So I thought I'll do it in song, and do vignettes of certain aspects of my life."

The cover photograph and as well as other photographs within the album's artwork were taken by rock photographer Rob Shanahan, who had worked closely with Starr for seven years.

Reception

At Metacritic, Ringo 2012 holds an average Metascore of 59 out of 100, based on five professional reviews, indicating a "mixed or average" reception. The album debuted at numbers 80 and 181 in the US and UK, selling 6,348 and 752 copies respectively, as of February 2012.

Track listing
CD

DVD edition

Personnel
Personnel per booklet.

Musicians
 Ringo Starr – drums, percussion, vocals, keyboards, backing vocals, guitar
 Steve Dudas – guitar, bass
 Bruce Sugar – keyboards, piano, horn, arrangement, organ, synth horns
 Amy Keys – backing vocals
 Kelly Moneymaker – backing vocals
 Joe Walsh – guitar
 Benmont Tench – organ
 Charlie Haden – bass
 Richard Page – backing vocals
 Van Dyke Parks – keyboards, accordion, string arrangement
 Matt Cartsonis – mandolin
 Don Was – bass
 Kenny Wayne Shepherd – guitar
 Edgar Winter – sax, organ
 David A. Stewart – guitar, keyboards
 Michael Bradford – bass
 Ann Marie Calhoun – violin

Production
 Ringo Starr – producer
 Bruce Sugar – recording
 Ned Douglas – recording assistant
 Ringo Starr, Bruce Sugar – mixing
 Chris Bellman – mastering
 Barry Korkin – UMe A&R coordination
 Christine Telleck – production manager
 David Tashman – legal
 Adam Starr – product manager
 Vartan – art direction
 Rob Shanahan – photos
 Mike Fink, Philip Manning, Meire Murakami – design

Charts

References

External links

2012 albums
Albums produced by Ringo Starr
Ringo Starr albums
Hip-O Records albums